Jack Richard Lankester (born 19 January 2000) is an English professional footballer who plays as a winger for Cambridge United.

Club career

Ipswich Town
Born in Bury St Edmunds, Lankester attended King Edward VI School, Bury St Edmunds and grew up supporting Ipswich Town. He joined the Ipswich youth system at the age of 6, progressing through the club's academy before earning a scholarship at the age of 14. In March 2018 he joined hometown team Bury Town on a work experience loan. He progressed from the under-18 team through to the under-23's during 2018, enjoying impressive scoring form, including a brace in a 2–1 win over Dagenham & Redbridge in the FA Youth Cup on 16 January 2018.

After being involved in the first team squad during the 2018–19 pre-season, he signed his first professional contract with the club on 17 August 2018, signing a two-year deal with the option of a further year's extension. He made his professional debut for the club on 21 October 2018, coming on as a substitute in a 2–0 home defeat to Queens Park Rangers. After making his second first-team appearance, Lankester was placed on standby for the England U19 national team in November 2018. He scored his first goal for the club in a 3–2 home defeat to Millwall on 1 January 2019. On 7 January 2019, he signed a new three-year contract at the club. He made 11 appearances in his debut senior season at Portman Road, with it being cut short in February 2019 due to suffering a back injury which put him out for the rest of the season. His impressive progress and lone goal earned him the club's Young Player of the Year award for the 2018–19 season.

He recovered and returned to the first team for pre-season, but suffered another stress fracture injury to his back in a friendly against Fortuna Düsseldorf in July. Lankaster subsequently underwent surgery which ruled him out until April 2020. Due to this injury and the season being suspended and later ended by the COVID-19 pandemic, Lankester made no appearances during the 2019–20 season.

Lankester returned to first-team action during the 2020–21 pre-season. He made his first appearance in almost 20 months as a substitute in a 2–0 away win over Bristol Rovers on 19 September 2020, crossing the ball into the box to force an own goal from Max Ehmer to open the scoring, before providing an assist for the second goal from Jon Nolan. He scored his first goal following his comeback from injury against Sunderland at the Stadium of Light on 3 November 2020. In the following league game, Lankester scored a 97th-minute winner in a 2–1 home win over Shrewsbury Town.

Cambridge United
On 25 June 2021, Lankester joined fellow East Anglia club Cambridge United for an undisclosed fee. This ended his 15 year association with Ipswich Town.

Career statistics

Honours
Individual
Ipswich Town Young Player of the Year: 2018–19

References

External links
Jack Lankester profile at the Ipswich Town F.C. website

2000 births
Living people
Sportspeople from Bury St Edmunds
English footballers
Association football wingers
Ipswich Town F.C. players
Bury Town F.C. players
Cambridge United F.C. players
Isthmian League players
English Football League players
People educated at King Edward VI School, Bury St Edmunds